Noah Lukeman (born November 28, 1973) is an American literary agent, actor, script-writer and author of works about writing and literature.  A number of his books are widely used in creative writing programs.  Lukeman has contributed to a number of newspapers and journals, including The Wall Street Journal and The New York Times. Some of his books have been translated into Portuguese, Japanese, Korean, Chinese and Indonesian. Lukeman is Founder of the Lukeman Literary Management.

Biography
Lukeman was born in New York City, the son of Brenda Shoshanna, a psychologist, actress, playwright and author, and Gerald Lukeman, a Shakespearean actor and director. After earning a BA in English and Creative Writing at Brandeis University, Lukeman worked for various publishers, including William Morrow and Farrar, Straus and Giroux. In 1996 Lukeman founded Lukeman Literary Management, in which capacity he acted as agent for a number of successful authors. In 2001 Lukeman joined Michael Ovitz' Artists Management Group (AMG), where he ran their New York publishing office for years before returning to being an independent agent." Lukeman has also acted in a few independent films.

Writing
Lukeman's writing is diverse in nature.  His first published works offered advice and techniques for writers. Since then, he has collaborated with an American Marine Corps general to write about the inner workings of CENTCOM (Central Command) and the wars in Iraq and Afghanistan, and has written a sequel to Shakespeare's Macbeth in blank verse. Lukeman also works as a screenwriter, and his screenplay, Brothers in Arms, was sold and named to The Black List (survey).

Bibliography

Non-fiction
(1999) The First Five Pages: A Writer’s Guide to Staying out of the Rejection Pile, Simon & Schuster 
(2002) The Plot Thickens: 8 Ways to Bring Fiction to Life,  St. Martins Press, 
(2006) A Dash of Style: The Art and Mastery of Punctuation, WW Norton (US) , Oxford University Press (UK)

Collaborations
with Michael DeLong:
 (2004) Inside CentCom: The Unvarnished Truth about the Wars in Afghanistan and Iraq,  Regenery Publishing  
(2007) A General Speaks Out: The Truth About the Wars in Afghanistan and Iraq, Zenith Publishing,

Screenplays
 Brothers in Arms

Plays
(2008) The Tragedy of Macbeth Part II: The Seed of Banquo, Pegasus,

References

External links
  Official website
 Interview by Catherine Tudor
 

1973 births
Living people
American male writers
Literary agents
Writers from New York City
Male actors from New York City
Brandeis University alumni